The Karlıova Triple Junction is a geologic triple junction of three tectonic plates: the Anatolian Plate, the Eurasian Plate and the Arabian Plate.

The Karlıova Triple Junction is found where the east-west trending North Anatolian Fault intersects the East Anatolian Fault coming up from the southwest. Because each arm of the junction is a transform fault (F), the Karlıova Triple Junction is an F-F-F type junction.

References
 "New constraints on the Karliova Triple Junction between Arabia, Eurasia and Anatolia", A. Hubert-Ferrari, Geophysical Research Abstracts, Vol. 9, 06822, 2007.
 MAY 1, 2003 BİNGÖL (TURKEY) EARTHQUAKE, Preliminary Report (Updated on May 13, 2003)

Triple junctions
Plate tectonics
Geology of Turkey